Rugby in Serbia may refer to:

Rugby union in Serbia
Rugby league in Serbia